Saint-Étienne-de-Tinée (literally Saint-Étienne of Tinée; ; Vivaro-Alpine: Sant Estève d'en Tiniá) is a commune in the Alpes-Maritimes department in southeastern France.

It was part of the historic County of Nice until 1860.

The ski resort of Auron is located on the territory of the commune, and linked to the village of Saint-Étienne-de-Tinée directly by a gondola lift.

Population

See also
Communes of the Alpes-Maritimes department

References

External links

Communes of Alpes-Maritimes
Alpes-Maritimes communes articles needing translation from French Wikipedia